"Helplessly, Hopelessly" is a song recorded by American country music artist Jessica Andrews.  It was released in June 2001 as the second single from the album Who I Am.  The song reached #31 on the Billboard Hot Country Singles & Tracks chart.  The song was written by Brett James and Troy Verges.

Chart performance

References

2001 singles
2001 songs
Jessica Andrews songs
Songs written by Brett James
Songs written by Troy Verges
Song recordings produced by Byron Gallimore
DreamWorks Records singles